William Bruce Strachan (Bruce Strachan) (born July 22, 1941) is a former politician in the Canadian province of British Columbia. Strachan was a school trustee and board chair, a regional district director, as well as a three-term MLA and cabinet minister. He served in the Legislative Assembly of British Columbia from 1979 to 1991, as a Social Credit member for the constituency of Prince George South.

After working as a professional musician in the United States of America, Strachan and his wife moved to Prince George, British Columbia in 1966 he and enrolled as an adult student at the College of New Caledonia. After graduating, he became an Information Officer for the college.

Political career 
In 1976, he was elected to the local school board where he later became the board chair. In 1979, he won his first provincial election campaign in the new constituency of Prince George South.

In 1988, as Minister of State for the Cariboo, he secured $100,000 for an initial feasibility study for the creation of the University of Northern British Columbia (UNBC). In 1990, as Minister of Advanced Education, Training and Technology, Strachan approved a $138 million budget to create the new campus for UNBC.

After provincial politics, he was elected to Prince George City Council as a city councillor and served as a director for the Regional District of Fraser-Fort George.

In 2009, he was a director of the No BC-STV Campaign Society that advocated for a No vote in the referendum about a new Single Transferable Vote ballot system in the province.

References

1941 births
British Columbia municipal councillors
British Columbia school board members
British Columbia Social Credit Party MLAs
Musicians from British Columbia
Living people
Members of the Executive Council of British Columbia
Politicians from Winnipeg